La compagna di banco is a 1977 commedia sexy all'italiana directed by Mariano Laurenti.

Cast 
 Lino Banfi: Teo D'Olivo
 Lilli Carati: Simona Girardi
 Gianfranco D'Angelo: Professor Ilario Cacioppo
 Alvaro Vitali: Salvatore
 Antonio Melidoni: Mario D'Olivo
 Francesca Romana Coluzzi: professoressa Malimonti
 Gigi Ballista: Girardi 
 Nikki Gentile: Elena Mancuso 
 Paola Maiolini: Vera
 Brigitte Petronio: Mirella 
 Giacomo Furia: commissario Acavallo

References

External links

1977 films
Commedia sexy all'italiana
Films directed by Mariano Laurenti
Italian high school films
Italian coming-of-age comedy films
1970s sex comedy films
Films scored by Gianni Ferrio
1977 comedy films
1970s Italian films